Kim Sung-kyun (born May 25, 1980) is a South Korean actor. Kim began his career in theatre, then made his screen debut as a gangster boss's faithful henchman in Nameless Gangster: Rules of the Time, followed by supporting roles in The Neighbor, Reply 1994, Reply 1988 and Moon Lovers: Scarlet Heart Ryeo (2016).

Filmography

Film

Television series

Web series

Theater

Awards and nominations

References

External links

1980 births
Living people
People from Daegu
South Korean male stage actors
South Korean male film actors
South Korean male television actors
Best New Actor Paeksang Arts Award (film) winners